The National Confectioners Association is an American trade organization that promotes chocolate, candy, gum and mints, and the companies that make these treats. NCA lobbies the American government in favor of the confectionery industry, evaluated at US$35 billion. Confections are produced in all 50 states. The association "annually hosts the National Candy Show in Chicago, as well as the Candy Hall of Fame".

Candy Hall of Fame
The Candy Hall of Fame is an event produced by the association that recognizes the achievements of leaders across the confectionery industry globally.

Class of 2021 
 Michelle Frame, Victus Ars
 Pam Gesford, The Hershey Company
 Forrest Mars Jr. (posthumous), Mars Wrigley Confectionery U.S.
 Deb Grenon, My Favorite Company, Inc.
 Barry Phillips, SpartanNash Co.
 Kurt Rosenberg (posthumous), Promotion in Motion Companies
 Alan Scharhon, Halfon Candy Co.
 Mark Schlott, R.M. Palmer Co.
 David Shaffer, Just Born, Inc.
 Douglas Simons, Enstrom Candies, Inc.
 Robert Taylor, Burdette Beckmann Inc.

Class of 2017 
  Peter Blommer, Blommer Chocolate Co.
 Rick Brindle, Mondelez International, Inc.
 Sara Clair, Brown & Haley
 Ray Cote, American Chocolate Mould Co.
 Basant Dwivedi, The Promotion In Motion Cos., Inc.
 Mary Beth Geraci, Carlin Group
 Richard Hartel, University of Wisconsin-Madison
 Scott Hartman, Rutter’s Holdings Inc.
 Rob Nelson, Elmer Candy Corp.
 Dave Taiclet, 1-800-Flowers.com/Fannie May Confections
 Mary Villa, URM Stores Inc.

Controversy 
In March 2007, the Chocolate Manufacturers Association, whose members include Hershey's, Nestlé, and Archer Daniels Midland, began lobbying the U.S. Food and Drug Administration (FDA) to change the legal definition of chocolate to allow the substitution of "safe and suitable vegetable fats and oils" (including partially hydrogenated vegetable oils) for cocoa butter in addition to using "any sweetening agent" (including artificial sweeteners) and milk substitutes. Currently, the FDA does not allow a product to be referred to as "chocolate" if the product contains any of these ingredients. To work around this restriction, products with cocoa substitutes are often branded or labeled as "chocolatey" or "made with chocolate".

On March 7, 2017, The Washington Post reported that the NCA was lobbying the Trump administration. The NCA's goal, as reported by the Post, was to advocate for the rollback of government policies that make the production of NCA members' products more expensive. One of the controversial issues reported by the Post was the scheduling of NCA events at Trump-owned properties. Thus, money is being paid by the NCA to Trump as they seek to influence government policy.

References

External links
Official website

American confectionery
Food industry trade groups
Culinary professional associations
1884 establishments in Illinois
Businesspeople halls of fame